Julius Hirsch (7 April 1892 – declared dead 8 May 1945) was a Jewish German Olympian international footballer who was murdered by the Nazis in Auschwitz concentration camp during the Holocaust. He helped the Karlsruher FV win the 1910 German football championship, and also played for the Germany national football team, including at the 1912 Summer Olympics. He then joined SpVgg Fürth, with whom he won the 1914 German football championship.

Biography
Hirsch was born in Achern, Germany (and later lived in Karlsruhe), was Jewish, and was the seventh child of a Jewish merchant. He joined Karlsruher FV at the age of ten.

Together with Fritz Förderer and Gottfried Fuchs, Hirsch formed an attacking trio.  Nicknamed "Juller", he was a dynamic midfielder/striker best known for his attacking style, his hard shot, and powerful left foot. He helped Karlsruher FV win the 1910 German football championship.

After joining SpVgg Fürth in 1913, he won the 1914 German football championship with them the following year.

Hirsch was the first Jewish player to represent the Germany national football team, which he joined at 18 years of age in 1911. He played in a number of matches for Germany, including at the 1912 Olympic Games in Stockholm, Sweden. Hirsch scored four goals for Germany against the Netherlands in 1912, becoming the first German to score four goals in a single match.

Hirsch enlisted in and served for four years in the German Army in World War I, and was decorated with the Iron Cross. His brother Leopold was killed in action in 1916, also fighting for the German Army.

He returned to KFV after World War I, and retired in 1925. However, he remained with the club as a youth coach.

Death 
Reading in a newspaper on 10 April 1933 that all Southern German clubs would ban Jewish members, Hirsch left KFV by his own choice after over 30 years as a member. In a letter to his club he requested that it should not be forgotten that, even though Jews were now the whipping boys of the nation, many of them had given their life blood for the German nation and were true patriots, as shown by their deeds and words. 

Hirsch's children Esther and Heinold, deemed second-grade "Mischlinge", were forced to leave their school in 1938. In 1941 they were required to wear the yellow star. In 1942 he divorced his non-Jewish wife in an effort to save her and their children from the Nazis.

Hirsch, now 50 years old, was deported from Karlsruhe, Germany, to Auschwitz concentration camp on 1 March 1943. He had not believed that the government would harm him, as he had fought for Germany in World War I and played for Germany's national football team.  His exact date of death is unknown. In 1950, a German court declared him dead with the date of death set on 8 May 1945, past his 53rd birthday and after the camp's liberation by the Red Army in January that year. His arrival was not registered in surviving camp records and it has been assumed from this he may have been gassed immediately after arrival in camp. In February 1945 his children were deported to Theresienstadt, from which they were liberated by the Red Army in May 1945.

Legacy
Since 2005 the German Football Federation awards the "Julius-Hirsch-Preis" for outstanding examples of integration and tolerance within German football.

In January 2020, Chelsea FC unveiled a mural by Solomon Souza on an outside wall of the West Stand at Stamford Bridge stadium. The mural is part of Chelsea's 'Say No to Antisemitism' campaign funded by club owner Roman Abramovich. Included on the mural are depictions of footballers Hirsch and Árpád Weisz, who were killed at Auschwitz concentration camp, and Ron Jones, a British prisoner of war known as the 'Goalkeeper of Auschwitz'.

See also
List of select Jewish football (association; soccer) players
List of people who disappeared

References

External links

 
Julius Hirsch at Yad Vashem website

1892 births
1945 deaths
Jewish footballers
German footballers
SpVgg Greuther Fürth players
Karlsruher FV players
Germany international footballers
Olympic footballers of Germany
Footballers at the 1912 Summer Olympics
German civilians killed in World War II
German people who died in Auschwitz concentration camp
German Jews who died in the Holocaust
Association football wingers
Jewish German sportspeople
Recipients of the Iron Cross (1914)
German Jewish military personnel of World War I
Footballers from Karlsruhe
People declared dead in absentia